The Girls Boarding School of the Ministry of Defence of the Russian Federation (GBS-MDRF) (Школа-интернат для девочек Министерства обороны Российской Федерации) is a Russian educational institution for girls operated by Ministry of Defense of Russia. The school is a pre-university educational institution of the Cadet Corps (Russia).

Overview

The school was established in 2008 as part of the Strategy for the Social Development of the Armed Forces of the Russian Federation. The daughters of servicemen are trained in the boarding school from 5th to 11th grade, annually accepting 120 girls who are of at least 11 years of age. At the end of the school year, many girls have the choice of attending military and civilian universities in Russia and abroad. At the moment, more than 50 clubs (choreographic, vocal, musical, sports, theatrical, cooking, journalism, drummers group, and others) are active in the school. After classes on weekdays, as well as on weekends and holidays, the girls together with their educators make trips to the city, visiting theaters, museums, exhibitions and parks in Moscow. The clothes that cadets wear are sewn by famed Russian stylists such as Kira Plastinina and Valentin Yudashkin, while physical education exercises are developed by the Cosmonaut Preparation Center.

Gallery of the Boarding School

See also
 Military academies in Russia
 Ministry of Defence (Russia)
 Boarding school
 Cadet Corps (Russia)

References

External links

 Official Website
 The School on MAPS.Me

Military academies of Russia
Schools in Russia
Educational institutions established in 2008
Girls boarding schools
2008 establishments in Russia